Kalasi is a village in the Nicobar district of Andaman and Nicobar Islands, India. It is located in the Nancowry tehsil.

The island is mentioned in Kollywood movie Thupparivaalan as native place of the mysterious antagonist.

Demographics 

According to the 2011 census of India, Kalasi has 78 households. The effective literacy rate (i.e. the literacy rate of population excluding children aged 6 and below) is 66.79%.

References 

Villages in Nancowry tehsil